is a Japanese seinen manga magazine published by Houbunsha and mainly consisting of four-panel comic strips. The first issue was released on 18 January 2003.

List of serialized titles
 

Bad Girl

H・R

Harumaki!

 (ongoing)
Himekurasu
Ichiroo!
K-On!
Kagura Mai Mai! (ongoing)
Kamisama no Iutoori!
 (ongoing)
 (ongoing)
 (ongoing)
Kuu Kuu Boku Boku
 (ongoing)
Mayuka no Darling!

 (ongoing)
OK Fantasista!

Puella Magi Kazumi Magica
Pura Misurando
RPG Fudōsan (ongoing)
 (ongoing)
 (ongoing)
S.S. Astro (ongoing)
Swap⇔Swap
Tamago Nama
The Airs
Tsumugu Otome to Taishou no Tsuki

List of anime adaptations
Hidamari Sketch – Winter 2007
Dōjin Work – Summer 2007
Hidamari Sketch × 365 – Summer 2008
K-On! – Spring 2009
GA Geijutsuka Art Design Class – Summer 2009
Hidamari Sketch × Hoshimittsu – Winter 2010
K-On!! – Spring 2010
A Channel – Spring 2011
Kill Me Baby – Winter 2012
Hidamari Sketch × Honeycomb – Fall 2012
Gokicha (ONA) – 2012
New Game! – Summer 2016
New Game!! – Summer 2017
Blend S – Fall 2017
Anima Yell! – Fall 2018
Machikado Mazoku – Summer 2019
Koisuru Asteroid – Winter 2020
Ochikobore Fruit Tart – Fall 2020
Machikado Mazoku 2 – Spring 2022
RPG Fudōsan – Spring 2022

List of game adaptations
 Hidamari Sketch Dokodemo Sugoroku × 365 – February 12, 2009
 GA: Geijutsuka Art Design Class -Slapstick Wonderland- – July 29, 2010
 New Game!: The Challenge Stage – January 26, 2017
 Kirara Fantasia – December 11, 2017

Notes

References

External links
Official website 

2003 establishments in Japan
Houbunsha magazines
Monthly manga magazines published in Japan
Magazines established in 2003
Seinen manga magazines
Yonkoma